Tatyana Pavlovna Gonobobleva (November 19, 1948 – May 28, 2007) is a former volleyball player for the USSR. Born in Saint Petersburg, she competed for the Soviet Union at the 1972 Summer Olympics.

References 

1948 births
2007 deaths
Sportspeople from Saint Petersburg
Soviet women's volleyball players
Russian women's volleyball players
Olympic volleyball players of the Soviet Union
Olympic gold medalists for the Soviet Union
Olympic medalists in volleyball
Medalists at the 1972 Summer Olympics
Volleyball players at the 1972 Summer Olympics